Vidataltivu is a coastal town in the Mannar District of northern Sri Lanka. It was used as the base to control the Mannar coast by the sea tigers of LTTE. Vidataltivu is the largest town on Sri Lanka's northern coast and was the major base of the Sea Tigers. The Sri Lankan military claimed to have captured this coastal town for the first time since the IPKF left Sri Lanka in 1990.

Schools
 Mn/St Josepvaz Maha Vidyalayam, Vidataltivu
 Mn/Aligarh Maha Vidyalayam, Vidataltivu

Religious places of worship

Catholic churches
 St. James' church, Vidataltivu
 St. Mary's church Vidataltivu

Hindu temple
 Pillaiyar temple

Sport clubs
 United sports club vidaththaltivu

See also 
Battle of the Forward Defence Lines

References

External links
Vidataltivu Nature Reserve at Google Maps

Towns in Mannar District
Manthai West DS Division